Matthew Dennis Hunt was a New Zealand Police constable whose killing in Massey on 19 June 2020 drew significant national media coverage. Eli Epiha, a 24-year-old man, pleaded guilty to his murder  while a 30-year-old woman, Natalie Bracken, was found guilty to being an accessory after the fact. Hunt's death marked the first police fatality in the line of duty in New Zealand since 2009.

Matthew Dennis Hunt
Matthew Hunt was a 28-year-old constable born on 30 July 1991 who had served in the New Zealand Police for two and half years. He spent the majority of his time as a frontline officer in his hometown, Orewa, before being transferred for a temporary rotation to the Impairment Prevention Team (IPT) based at the Auckland Harbour Bridge Police Station. When Hunt joined in October 2017 he joined as a part of Wing 312 trained at the Royal New Zealand Police College at Papakōwhai. He was raised by his mother alongside his sister in the Hibiscus Coast and attended Orewa College. According to his family, Hunt's "life-long dream" was to be a police officer after studying criminology and working in prisons.

The incident
On 19 June at 10:37am (NZST), Constable Matthew Hunt and a second police officer were shot after a car they had tried to pull over crashed on Reynella Drive in Massey, Auckland. Constable Hunt was killed during the shooting. His colleague was wounded and admitted to hospital. A member of the public was also injured by a vehicle during the incident. According to Police, the suspect fled into a silver Mazda Demio following the shooting and later abandoned the vehicle.

Manhunt and investigation
In response, the Police including members of the Armed Offenders Squad and Eagle helicopters launched a manhunt for the perpetrators and searched vehicles. Eight schools in Massey were also placed in lockdown including Massey High School and Don Buck Primary School. Armed police officers also guarded police stations.

Several hours after the shooting, the Police stormed a home in Rena Place in Auckland's West Harbour. In addition, Police also arrested a fleeing driver on the Lincoln Road overbridge in the Northeast Motorway after using road spikes to stop his car. The police also spoke to two persons of interest. Later that night, a 24-year-old man was charged with murder, attempted murder and dangerous driving causing injury. The man briefly appeared in the Waitakere district court on 20 June where he was formally arraigned and remanded into custody until his next court appearance on 8 July.

On 20 June, the Police announced that they were looking for a 30-year-old woman named Natalie Bracken in relation to the shooting incident. She was charged with driving charges and as an accessory to the murder. Later that day, the Police took Bracken into custody in West Auckland and confirmed that she was assisting police inquiries.

Legal proceedings
In early July 2020, Eli Epiha appeared in the Auckland High Court where he pleaded not guilty to murdering Constable Hunt and the attempted murder of the second police officer. He also pleaded not guilty to guilty to dangerous driving, causing injury to a member of the public. On 14 August, Epiha's name suppression lapsed after he abandoned his appeal for name suppression.

In early July 2021, Epiha pleaded guilty to Hunt's murder and dangerous driving causing injury after fleeing Police. However, Epiha pleaded not guilty to the alleged attempted murder of the second police officer, who was identified as Constable David Goldfinch. On 12 July, Judge Geoffrey Venning convened a jury for Epiha's trial for the attempted murder of Goldfinch. In addition, suppression of Epiha's earlier guilty pleas and a non-publication order of images of the defendant was also lifted.

That same month, Epiha's accomplice Natalie Bracken faced trial for being an accessory after the fact of murder. Following her arrest, Bracken had claimed that Epiha had threatened her at gunpoint into driving him away following the shooting of the police officers. During the trial, a cellphone video by a member of the public was played showing Bracken obtaining the keys to a car that was parked on Massey's Reynella Drive and departing with Epiha in the passenger seat.  Bracken's defence lawyer Adam Couchman claimed that she had driven Epiha from the scene with the aim of protecting people and preventing further bloodshed. Prosecutor Brian Dickey disputed Bracken's claim, pointing out that Bracken had not disarmed Epiha and facilitated his escape.

On 27 July 2021, Epiha was found guilty of the attempted murder of Goldfinch. During the trial, the defendant had maintained that he did not intend to kill Goldfinch. After  hours of deliberations, the jury convicted Epiha of attempted murder. In addition, Bracken was convicted of being an accessory after the fact of wounding with intent to cause grievous bodily harm.

On 1 October 2021, Bracken was sentenced to twelve months imprisonment for her role as an accessory to causing grievous bodily harm. Justice Venning rejected the defendant's claim that she had acted under compulsion to protect others, stating that she had the opportunity to run away or to hide in her house instead of returning to her house to obtain her car keys. Hunt's mother Diane Hunt also criticised the defendant for helping the killer escape and her perceived selfishness during the trial.

On 10 December 2021, Epiha was sentenced to life imprisonment with a minimum non-parole period of 27 years. During the sentencing, Justice Venning rejected the defendant's claim that he had acted recklessly without intention. He also declined the Crown prosecutor's recommendation that Epiha be sentenced to life imprisonment without parole, taking into account the defendant's age, history of violence and lack of remorse. The victim's mother Diane also described Epiha's apology as "vacuous" and described the devastating impact of Hunt's death on her life in her victim impact statement.

On 7 October 2022, Epiha and his lawyer Mark Edgar appealed his sentence to the Court of Appeal, arguing that life imprisonment was unjustifiably harsh and prevented rehabilitation. Edgar claimed that Epiha had been treated harshly in comparison to other convicted murderers including Daniel Luff and Russell John Tully. Edgar also argued that Justice Venning had elevated the victims because they were Police. In response, Crown lawyer Brian Dickey defended Epiha's sentence of life imprisonment, arguing that the defendant had made a determined effort to kill the Police officers despite lacking premeditation. Dickey argued that Epiha posed a serious risk to public safety if released and emphasised that the defendant had delayed pleading guilty to Hunt's murder.

On 27 November, the Court of Appeal rejected Epiha's appeal against his 27 year prison sentence, arguing that the sentence was not "manifestly excessive" and that the community needed protection from a violent man.

Aftermath
In response to the shooting, Police Commissioner Andrew Coster stated that "the incident points to the real risk that our officers face as they go about their jobs every day." He confirmed that police officers were not armed at the time and reiterated his commitment to an unarmed police force.

New Zealand Prime Minister Jacinda Ardern offered her condolences in Parliament, stating that "our police officers work hard every day to keep us and our communities safe." Deputy Prime Minister Winston Peters stated that "Police Lives Matter" during his tribute to Hunt. National Member of Parliament Mark Mitchell read a tribute from Hunt's mother and recounted an incident in which Hunt convinced a knife-wielding offender to lower his weapon. Greens co-leader James Shaw also paid tribute to Hunt, stating that it was a "heartbreaking reminder" that a police officer's life could be taken at any moment.

On 20 June, the Sky Tower in Auckland lit up in Police blue colours in honour of the death of Hunt.

On 22 June, it was reported that two relatives of Hunt, who had traveled from Australia to attend his funeral, had expressed frustration that they had to undergo quarantine in Rotorua as they wanted all relatives that had travelled from overseas to quarantine together for two weeks as a result of the COVID-19 pandemic in New Zealand. On 22 June, the Government granted permission for family members of Hunt, traveling from overseas, to quarantine together in Auckland.

On 26 June, Police officers across the country held a minute of silence in honour of Hunt. 100 police officers gathered in Auckland's Aotea Square to pay tribute to their comrade. Hunt's sister, father, uncle and aunt watched from their hotel rooms above, whilst in quarantine.

On 9 July, Hunt's funeral was held, and on that night, the Auckland Sky Tower lit up in varying colours of blue to mark his funeral.

References

Crime in Auckland
Deaths by firearm in New Zealand
June 2020 crimes in Oceania
June 2020 events in New Zealand
2020 murders in New Zealand
2020s in Auckland
New Zealand police officers killed in the line of duty